A by-election was held in the UK Parliament constituency of Old Bexley and Sidcup on 2 December 2021, following the death of the sitting member of parliament, James Brokenshire, who had been the Conservative MP for the constituency since 2010. The by-election was the fifth of the 58th Parliament, which was elected in 2019.

The election was won by Conservative candidate Louie French with a reduced majority.

Background

Old Bexley and Sidcup is a constituency in south-east London. The constituency includes the suburbs of East Wickham, Falconwood, Welling, Blackfen, Bexley and Sidcup. It voted to leave the European Union by 61 per cent to 39 per cent in the 2016 referendum.

The constituency was created in 1983 and has only elected Conservative Members of Parliament. For 18 years, former Prime Minister Edward Heath, who had represented predecessor constituencies since 1950, represented Old Bexley and Sidcup. He retired from Parliament in 2001. James Brokenshire was first elected in 2010. He had previously been the MP for Hornchurch from 2005 until it was abolished when the Fifth Periodic Review of Westminster constituencies took effect in 2010. In 2019, he was re-elected with a majority of nearly 19,000 votes, the largest majority he had ever achieved.

Brokenshire died from cancer on 7 October 2021, while serving. The writ of election was moved by Conservative Chief Whip Mark Spencer on 1 November.

On 3 November, polling day was confirmed for 2 December, with nominations closing on 9 November.

Candidates 
On 28 October 2021, Labour announced its candidate as Daniel Francis, a councillor for Belvedere, who was the Leader of the Labour Group on Bexley Council from 2017 to 2021. The other shortlisted Labour candidates were Marcus Storm, Luke Murphy, and Rachel Taggart-Ryan.

On 29 October, Reform UK announced that their leader Richard Tice would be their candidate.

On 30 October, Bexley councillor Louie French was chosen as the Conservative candidate. French had represented the Falconwood & Welling ward since 2014.

The Green Party selected Jonathan Rooks, a lecturer at South Bank University, who had previously contested the seat in 2010.

David Kurten, a Former Member of the London Assembly for UKIP, stood for the Heritage Party, which he founded and leads.

Care worker Simone Reynolds was selected as the candidate for the Liberal Democrats. Reynolds previously contested the seat in 2019.

Mad Mike Young, a former Minster Parish Councillor, was selected for the Official Monster Raving Loony Party.

When nominations closed on 9 November it was announced that there were 11 candidates.

Results 
Changes to the vote share are relative to the result in the 2019 general election.

Previous result

References

2021 elections in the United Kingdom
2021 in London
Old Bexley and Sidcup,2021
December 2021 events in the United Kingdom
Elections in the London Borough of Bexley